The following is a list of current commercial operators of the Boeing 747, and any of its variants.

Airline operators
There were 449 Boeing 747 aircraft in active airline service as of February 2023, comprising 0 747-100s, 4 747SPs, 19 747-200s, 4 747-300s, 268 747-400s, and 154 747-8s. These aircraft are listed by airline operators and variant in the following table.

Data at February 2023.

Orders and deliveries

Data through end of February 2021.

Civil operators
Original Operators - ♠

Boeing 747-100

 Aer Lingus ♠
 Air Atlanta Icelandic
 Air Canada ♠
 Air France ♠
 Air Hong Kong
 Alitalia ♠
 Air India
 All Nippon Airways ♠
 American Airlines ♠
 Braniff International ♠
 British Overseas Airways Corporation ♠
 British Airways
 Canadian Pacific Airlines
 China Airlines
 Corsair
 Continental Airlines ♠
 Delta Air Lines ♠
 Eastern Air Lines
 Evergreen International Airlines
 Federal Express
 Iberia ♠
 Iran Air ♠
 Japan Air Lines ♠
 Japan Asia Airlines ♠
 Kabo Air
 Lufthansa ♠
 National Airlines ♠
 Northwest Airlines ♠
 Okada Air
 Pan American World Airways ♠
 Qatar Airways
 Royal Air Maroc
 SABENA ♠
 Saha Airlines
 Saudi Arabian Airlines ♠
 Scandinavian Airlines
 Tower Air
 Trans Air Service
 Trans World Airlines ♠
 United Airlines ♠
 UPS Airlines
 Virgin Atlantic
 Wardair ♠
 LANChile

Boeing 747SP

 Aerolíneas Argentinas
 Air Mauritius
 Air Namibia
 Alliance Air
 American Airlines
 Australia Asia Airlines
 Avia Airlines
 Braniff International ♠
 CAAC ♠
 China Airlines ♠
 Corsair
 Iran Air ♠
 Iraqi Airways ♠
 Japan Air Lines ♠
 Kazakhstan Airlines
 Korean Air ♠
 Luxair
 Mandarin Airlines
 Pan American World Airways ♠
 Qantas ♠
 Saudi Arabian Airlines ♠
 South African Airways ♠
 Syrian Air ♠
 Trans World Airlines ♠
 United Airlines

Boeing 747-200

 Aerolíneas Argentinas ♠
 Air Afrique ♠
 Air Canada ♠
 Air China ♠
 Air Club International
 Air France ♠
 Air Gabon ♠
 Air India ♠
 Air Madagascar ♠
 Air New Zealand ♠
 Alitalia ♠
 All Nippon Airways ♠
 American International Airways
 Atlas Air
 Avianca ♠
 Braniff International ♠
 British Airways ♠
 CAAC ♠
 Cameroon Airlines ♠
 Canadian Pacific Airlines
 Cargolux ♠
 Cathay Pacific ♠
 China Airlines ♠
 Condor Airlines ♠
 Continental Airlines
 Corsair
 El Al ♠
 Evergreen International Airlines
 Fars Air Qeshm
 Federal Express
Fly Pro
 Flying Tiger ♠
 Garuda Indonesia ♠
 Iberia ♠
 Iraqi Airways ♠
 Iran Air ♠
 Japan Air Lines ♠
 KLM ♠ 
 Korean Air ♠
 Kuwait Airways ♠
 Lufthansa ♠
 Martinair ♠
 Middle East Airlines ♠
 Nippon Cargo Airlines ♠
 Northwest Airlines ♠
 Olympic Airways ♠
 Pakistan International Airlines ♠
 Pan American World Airways ♠
 Philippine Airlines ♠
 Qantas ♠
 Royal Air Maroc ♠
 Royal Jordanian ♠
 SABENA ♠
 Saha Airlines
 Scandinavian Airlines ♠
 Seaboard World Airlines ♠
 Singapore Airlines ♠
 South African Airways ♠
 Swissair ♠
 TAP Air Portugal ♠
 Thai Airways International ♠
 Tower Air
 Transamerica Airlines ♠
 Trans World Airlines
Transaero
 Continental Airlines
 Union de Transports Aériens
 United Airlines ♠
 VARIG
 Virgin Atlantic

Boeing 747-300

 Air France
 Air India ♠
 Ansett Australia
 Cathay Pacific ♠
 Egyptair ♠
 Japan Airlines ♠
 Japan Asia Airways ♠
 KLM ♠
 Korean Air ♠
 Mahan Air
 Malaysia Airlines ♠
  Pakistan International Airlines
 Qantas ♠
 SABENA ♠
 Saudi Arabian Airlines ♠
 Singapore Airlines ♠
 South African Airways ♠
 Surinam Airways
 Swissair ♠
 Thai Airways International ♠
Transaero
 Union de Transports Aériens ♠
 VARIG ♠

Boeing 747-400

 Air Canada ♠
 Aerolíneas Argentinas
Aerotranscargo
 Air China ♠
 Air France ♠
 Air India ♠
 Air Namibia ♠
 Air New Zealand ♠
Air Pacific
 All Nippon Airways ♠
 Asiana Airlines ♠
 Atlas Air ♠
 British Airways ♠
 Canadian Airlines ♠
 CargoLogicAir
 Cargolux ♠
 Cathay Pacific ♠
 China Airlines ♠
 China Cargo Airlines ♠
 China Southern Airlines ♠
 El Al ♠
 EVA Airways ♠
 Garuda Indonesia ♠
 Jade Cargo International ♠
 Japan Air Lines ♠
Kalitta Air
 KLM ♠
 Korean Air ♠
 Kuwait Airways ♠
 LoadAir Cargo ♠
 Lufthansa ♠
 Malaysia Airlines ♠
 Mandarin Airlines ♠
 Martinair ♠
 Nippon Cargo Airlines ♠
 Northwest Airlines ♠
 Philippine Airlines ♠
 Qantas ♠
 Royal Air Maroc
 Saudi Arabian Airlines ♠
 Singapore Airlines ♠
 South African Airways ♠
 Thai Airways International ♠
 Transaero
 UPS Airlines ♠
 Union de Transports Aériens ♠
 United Airlines ♠
 VARIG
 Virgin Atlantic ♠
 Virgin Galactic
 Virgin Orbit

Boeing 747-8

 Air China ♠
 AirBridgeCargo Airlines ♠
 Cargolux Airlines ♠
 Cathay Pacific ♠
 Korean Air ♠
 Lufthansa ♠
 Nippon Cargo Airlines ♠
 Qatar Airways ♠
 Silk Way Airlines ♠
 UPS Airlines ♠

Military and government operators

Summary of deliveries

 Boeing data through end of December 2022.

References

Further reading

747
Boeing 747